Steve James Hecht (born November 12, 1965 in Palm Springs, California) is a performance coach for the Seattle Mariners. His job is to focus on mental training. Hecht spent three years as the Texas Rangers' performance coach.

He previously played in the Minor Leagues and has a  degree in psychology.

Playing career
He previously played in the San Francisco Giants organization, the Montreal Expos organization, the Texas Rangers organization and the Detroit Tigers organization. He played one season at the Short-season level, two seasons at the Class-A level, four seasons at the Double-A level and six season at the Triple-A level.

In eight professional seasons he batted .273 with 721 hits, 116 doubles, 49 triples and 31 home runs in 807 games.

Coaching career

Texas Rangers
In  Hecht was hired as the Rangers' performance coach. His task was to focus on the players mental health. He held that position until

Seattle Mariners

References

External links
Career statistics from Baseball Reference.

Living people
1965 births
Sportspeople from Palm Springs, California
Baseball players from California
Everett Giants players
San Jose Giants players
Phoenix Firebirds players
Shreveport Captains players
Indianapolis Indians players
Harrisburg Senators players
Oklahoma City 89ers players
Oral Roberts Golden Eagles baseball players
Toledo Mud Hens players
Seattle Mariners coaches
Texas Rangers coaches
Baseball players at the 1987 Pan American Games
Pan American Games medalists in baseball
Pan American Games silver medalists for the United States
Medalists at the 1987 Pan American Games